Pokémon the Series: Sun & Moon – Ultra Legends is the twenty-second season of the Pokémon anime series, and the third and final season of Pokémon the Series: Sun & Moon, known in Japan as . It originally aired in Japan from October 21, 2018, to November 3, 2019, on TV Tokyo, this season follows the adventures of Ash Ketchum and his classmates Lillie, Lana, Mallow, Kiawe, and Sophocles at the Pokémon school in the Alola region, and the season premiered in the United States from March 23, 2019, to March 7, 2020, on Disney XD, as it was the last season to air on television in the country. Starting with season 23, the English dub moved to online streaming releases via Netflix in the United States.

The ending songs are "Notebook of the Heart" (心のノート, Kokoro no Nōto) by the Hino City Nanaomidori Elementary School Choir, "Type: Wild 2019" (タイプ：ワイルド2019, Taipu: Wairudo 2019) by Shoko Nakagawa. The English opening song is "The Challenge of Life" performed by Dani Marcus and the Sad Truth. Its instrumental version serves as the ending theme.



Episode list

Home media releases 
Viz Media and Warner Home Video have released the series in the United States on three two-disc volume sets that contain 18 episodes each. The only bonus features on each release are a creditless opening and closing sequence.

The first: "The Last Grand Trial", was released on September 8, 2020, The second: "The Alola League Begins!", was released on January 12, 2021, and the final release: "The First Alola League Champion", was released on May 4, 2021.

Notes

References

2018 Japanese television seasons
2019 Japanese television seasons
Season22